The steamboat Enterprise demonstrated for the first time by her epic  voyage from New Orleans to Brownsville, Pennsylvania  that steamboat commerce was practical on the Mississippi River and its tributaries.

Early days
The Enterprise, or Enterprize, with an engine and power train designed and built by Daniel French, was launched before June 1814 at Brownsville for her owners: the shareholders of the Monongahela and Ohio Steam Boat Company. The Enterprise, under the command of Israel Gregg, was first used to transport passengers and cargo to ports between Brownsville and Louisville, Kentucky. From June to December she completed two  voyages from Louisville to Pittsburgh that were performed against strong river currents. With these voyages the Enterprise demonstrated for the first time that steamboat commerce was practical on the Ohio River.

Voyage to New Orleans
On December 2, General Andrew Jackson had marched from Mobile, Alabama to New Orleans with orders to oppose an imminent military invasion by an overwhelming British force. Jackson had been making frequent requests for military supplies, especially small firearms and ammunition, that were in short supply. To this end, the shareholders made the decision to send the Enterprise. Command was transferred to Henry Miller Shreve, a Brownsville resident and experienced keelboat captain, who had firsthand knowledge of the hazards to navigation of the Ohio and Mississippi Rivers. On December 21, 1814, the Enterprise departed Pittsburgh bound for New Orleans with a cargo of "Cannon-balls, Gun-Carriages, Smith's Tools, Boxes of Harness, &c". On December 28, the Enterprise passed the Falls of the Ohio at Louisville, delivering the cargo of military supplies at the port of New Orleans on January 9, 1815.

Battle of New Orleans

Under normal circumstances, the voyage by the Enterprise into Louisiana's waters would have been a violation of the territorial steamboat monopoly granted to Robert R. Livingston and Robert Fulton. However, the Enterprise was protected from the monopolists and free to navigate the state's waters by the martial law imposed by General Andrew Jackson on December 16.

Despite the military supplies delivered by the Enterprise, Jackson's forces were still in dire need, particularly for small firearms, gunpowder and shot. Responding to reports that several boats laden with military supplies were near Natchez, Jackson sent the Enterprise. The boats were located and the Enterprise took them in tow, delivering them to New Orleans.

Then the Enterprise made another voyage to Natchez and returned to the port of New Orleans by February 12, 1815 when she was entered for the first time in the New Orleans Wharf Register as "Steam Boat (le petit) Captne Shrive". 

Then the Enterprise steamed up the Red River to Alexandria with 250 troops in tow and returned to New Orleans.

Voyage to Brownsville
On February 4, 1815, the British fleet, with all of the troops aboard, set sail for Mobile Bay. On February 16, the United States Senate ratified the Treaty of Ghent, finally putting an end to the War of 1812. However, official dispatches announcing the peace would not reach New Orleans until late February.

On March 1, Shreve advertised in a Natchez newspaper that the Enterprise would "ply between Natchez and New Orleans every nine days until the first week in May" when the Enterprise would depart New Orleans for Louisville. On March 13, Andrew Jackson rescinded martial law. On April 21, payment of the wharfage fee for the Enterprise was recorded.

On May 1, John Livingston submitted a petition to the Federal Court accusing captain Henry Shreve and the shareholders of the Monongahela and Ohio Steam Boat Company of violating the territorial steamboat monopoly granted to Robert R. Livingston and Robert Fulton. John Livingston's petition requested a payment of $5,000 and the forfeiture of the Enterprise. Sheriff John H. Holland, acting on orders issued by the court, quickly arrested Henry Shreve and seized the Enterprise. On May 2, attorney Abner L. Duncan, representing the shareholders of the Monongahela and Ohio Steam Boat Company, posted bail and made arrangements for Shreve and the Enterprise to be released.

On May 6, Shreve and the Enterprise finally departed New Orleans and, after a voyage of 1,500 miles, reached Louisville on May 31. The Enterprise was the first steamboat to reach Louisville from New Orleans. Then the Enterprise steamed to Pittsburgh and Brownsville. The importance of this voyage was expressed in newspapers throughout the West.

Second Voyage to New Orleans
In August and autumn of 1815, Captain Lowns, having replaced Captain Shreve, commanded the Enterprise during voyages to Ohio River ports between Pittsburgh and Louisville. 

In November 1815, the Monongahela and Ohio Steam Boat Co. leased the Enterprise to shareholder James Tomlinson for $2,000.  Tomlinson's son-in-law, Daniel Wehrley (or Worley), became the captain of the Enterprise. Bound for New Orleans the Enterprise arrived at Shippingport in grand style on January 21, 1816. On January 25, the Enterprise "with a full cargo of flour, whiskey, apples, &c. and a number of passengers" departed Shippingport bound for New Orleans. The Enterprise reached the port of New Orleans by February 27. Then the Enterprise completed a roundtrip voyage when she returned to the port of New Orleans by April 5.

Enterprise trial at New Orleans

The Dispatch, owned as well as the Enterprise by the Monongahela and Ohio Steam Boat Company, steamed from Brownsville to Louisville under the command of Israel Gregg. At Louisville command was transferred to Henry Bruce who navigated the Dispatch to the port of New Orleans by February 13, 1816. While docked at the landing, an incident occurred aboard the Dispatch that Robert Rogers, the first engineer, would chronicle in his autobiography:

Accounts of this incident were published in newspapers throughout the West. Furthermore, during January of 1817 the Kentucky legislature responded to the seizures of the Enterprise and the Dispatch by passing a resolution.

Documents for the impending Enterprise trial, having been transported aboard the Dispatch, were delivered to defense attorney Abner L. Duncan. On February 14, Duncan submitted his "Supplemental answer to the Judge of the District Court for the First Judicial District of the State of Louisiana".

During May 1816, the Enterprise trial, judge Dominic A. Hall presiding, was held in the old Spanish courthouse, 919 Royal Street. The plaintiffs were represented by John R. Grymes, the defendants by Abner L. Duncan. Duncan submitted to the court Daniel French's 1809 federal patent for his improved steamboat engine, that powered the Enterprise. Duncan argued that this federal patent protected all of the defendants – French, Shreve and the shareholders of the Monongahela and Ohio Steam Boat Co. – from the charges by the monopolists. On May 20, Judge Hall, stating that the Territorial Legislature had exceeded its authority in granting the steamboat monopoly, dismissed the petition of the plaintiffs. A letter announcing the news of Judge Hall's decision and proclaiming its significance to the growth of steamboat commerce and the economy of the West was published in a Louisville newspaper.

Final voyage

Steaming from New Orleans under the command of Daniel Wehrley the Enterprise reached Shippingport by August 5, 1816. Because the Ohio River above the Falls was too shallow for the voyage to continue, the Enterprise was anchored in Rock Harbor.

Historian Thomas Shourds utilized firsthand information provided by Elisha Hunt, the principal founder and shareholder of the Monongahela and Ohio Steam Boat Company, to chronicle the final days of the Enterprise:

 

During August or early autumn of 1816, the Enterprise, while safely anchored in Rock Harbor, "filled and sank to the bottom" where, in the words of Elisha Hunt, "she still is."

Legacy
1. The Enterprise demonstrated for the first time that steamboat commerce was practical on the Mississippi River and its tributaries. 

2. The Enterprise trial eliminated the ability of the monopolists to restrict competition. 

3. The Enterprise was relatively inexpensive to build, reportedly costing $9,000 compared to $38,000 for the New Orleans. 

4. The Enterprise, due to the sternwheel design, had the option to transport cargo by tying a barge alongside her hull. Since a barge could be loaded and unloaded independently, no time was spent loading or unloading the steamboat. Furthermore, a loaded barge could be picked up or delivered at places on the river that were not typical loading docks.

These facts opened the way for the subsequent rapid growth of steamboat commerce on America's western rivers.

Gallery

See also
Battle of New Orleans
Daniel French
Henry Miller Shreve
Monongahela and Ohio Steam Boat Company

Notes

References
Cox, Thomas H. (2009). Gibbons v. Ogden, law, and society in the early republic. Ohio, Athens: Ohio University Press, 264 pages.
Cramer, Zadok (1817). The navigator containing directions for navigating the Monongahela, Allegheny, Ohio, and Mississippi rivers..., 9th edition, Pittsburgh: Cramer, Spear and Eichbaum
Davis, William C. (2006). The pirates Laffite: the treacherous world of the corsairs of the Gulf. New York: Harcourt Publishing Co., First Harvest edition, 706 pages.
Ellis, Franklin (1882). History of Fayette county, Pennsylvania, with biographical sketches of many of its pioneers and prominent men. Philadelphia: L. H. Everts & Co.
Gleig, George Robert (1827). The campaigns of the British army at Washington and New Orleans, 1814–1815. London: J. Murray.
Hardin, J. Fair (ed.), (1927). "The first great western river captain; Henry Miller Shreve". Louisiana Historical Quarterly 10 (1): 25-67.
Head, David (2015). Privateers of the Americas: Spanish American privateering from the United States in the early republic. Athens: University of Georgia Press, 224 pages.
Henshaw, Marc Nicholas (2014). "Hog chains and Mark Twains: a study of labor history, archaeology, and industrial ethnography of the steamboat era of the Monongahela Valley 1811-1950." Dissertation, Michigan Technological University
Hunter, Louis C. (1949). Steamboats on the western rivers, an economic and technological history. Cambridge, Massachusetts: Harvard University Press, 1949; reprint, New York: Dover Publications, 1993.
Latour, Arsene Lacarriere (1816). Historical memoir of the war in West Florida and Louisiana in 1814–1815. Philadelphia: John Conrad.
Louisiana Historical Society (1915). Publications of the Louisiana historical society. New Orleans: American Printing Co., 7 (1).
Maass, Alfred R. (1994). "Brownsville's steamboat Enterprize and Pittsburgh's supply of general Jackson's army". Pittsburgh History 77: 22-29. 
Maass, Alfred R. (1996). "Daniel French and the western steamboat engine". The American Neptune 56: 29–44.
Maass, Alfred R. (1999). "The right of unrestricted navigation on the Mississippi, 1812–1818". The American Neptune  60: 49–59.
McMurtrie, Henry M. (1819). Sketches of Louisville and its environs;.... Louisville: S. Penn, 270 pages
Morrison, John H. (1903). History of American steam navigation. New York: W. F. Sanetz & Co.
New Orleans Wharf RegisterA handwritten document (mostly in French) recording the date of arrival, name, type and fee for each boat in the port of New Orleans. Registration was suspended from December 16, 1814 until January 28, 1815.New Orleans Public Library, 219 Loyola Avenue, New Orleans, LA 70112-2044Call number: QN420 1806-1823, New Orleans (La.) Collector of Levee Dues. Registers of flatboats, barges, rafts, and steamboats in the port of New Orleans, 1806-1823.
Remini, Robert V. (1999). The battle of New Orleans. New York: Penguin Books.
Rogers, James S. (editor) (1901). "Memoranda made by Robert Rogers", Philadelphia. Transcription of the original autobiographical manuscript written by Robert Rogers.
Shourds, Thomas (1876). History and genealogy of Fenwick's Colony, New Jersey. Bridgeton, New Jersey: 314-320. 
Smith, Zachary F. (1904). The battle of New Orleans. Louisville, Kentucky: John P. Morton & Co.
Stecker, H. Dora (1913). "Constructing a navigation system in the West". Ohio Archaeological and Historical Quarterly 22: 16–27.
Thurston, George H. (1857). Pittsburgh as it is. Pittsburgh, Pennsylvania: W. S. Haven.

External links
"Brownsville's steamboat Enterprize and Pittsburgh's supply of general Jackson's army". Scholarly article written by Alfred R. Maass.
History of the Enterprise Scholarly article written by Thomas Shourds that is based on contemporaneous documents and information provided by Barclay White and eyewitness accounts by Elisha Hunt. 
"Memoranda made by Robert Rogers" Transcription of the original autobiographical manuscript written by Robert Rogers.
"Steam Boat Navigation" by Benjamin H. Latrobe Public notice by an agent of Livingston and Fulton in response to the arrival of the Enterprise at Pittsburgh.
The Enterprise trial at New Orleans Petition composed by defense attorney Abner L. Duncan, filed on February 14, 1816.
History of the steamboat Enterprise at the Battle of New Orleans Courtesy of the Louisiana State History Museum.

Steamboats of the Monongahela River
Steamboats of the Mississippi River
Steamboats of the Ohio River
History of Kentucky
History of Louisiana
History of Ohio
History of Pennsylvania
Paddle steamers
Ships built in Brownsville, Pennsylvania
1814 ships